Gompers School may refer to:

 Gompers Preparatory Academy in San Diego, California
 Gompers School, also known as Eastern High School and Samuel Gompers General Vocational School, in Baltimore, Maryland
 Samuel Gompers Career and Technical Education High School in The Bronx, New York
 Gompers Woodworking School in Seattle, Washington